3330 Gantrisch, provisional designation , is a dark asteroid from the outer regions of the asteroid belt and the largest member of the Lixiaohua family, approximately 36 kilometers in diameter. It was discovered on 12 September 1985, by Swiss astronomer Thomas Schildknecht at Zimmerwald Observatory near Bern, Switzerland. It was named after the Gantrisch mountain.

Classification 

Gantrisch is a member of the Lixiaohua family, an outer-belt asteroid family of more than 700 known members, which consists of C-type and X-type asteroids and is named after 3556 Lixiaohua. With diameter of 36 kilometers, Gantrisch is significantly larger than all other, low-numbered members of this family: 3556 Lixiaohua (20 km), 5771 Somerville (26 km), 5900 Jensen (19 km) and 8773 Torquilla (14 km).

Largest member 

Since Gantrisch is the family's largest member, the Lixiaohua family is sometimes called "Gantrisch family". However, renaming families leads to potential confusion and is discouraged by Nesvorný, who proposes to keep the original name and regards the family name as a "label", irrespective of whether or not its namesake is the largest and/or lowest numbered member.

Orbit 

Gantrisch orbits the Sun in the outer main-belt at a distance of 2.5–3.8 AU once every 5 years and 7 months (2,048 days). Its orbit has an eccentricity of 0.20 and an inclination of 10° with respect to the ecliptic.

The body's observation arc also begins at Heidelberg in March 1933, more than 52 years prior to its official discovery observation at Zimmerwald.

Physical characteristics 

According to the survey carried out by the NEOWISE mission of NASA's Wide-field Infrared Survey Explorer, Gantrisch measures 35.717 kilometers in diameter and its surface has an albedo of 0.033.

Rotation period 

As of 2017, no rotational lightcurve of Gantrisch has been obtained from photometric observations. The asteroid's rotation period, poles and shape remains unknown.

Naming 

This minor planet was named after the Gantrisch mountain, located south of the discovering observatory in the Bernese Alps. The official naming citation was published by the Minor Planet Center on 3 May 1996.

References

External links 
 Asteroid Lightcurve Database (LCDB), query form (info )
 Dictionary of Minor Planet Names, Google books
 Asteroids and comets rotation curves, CdR – Observatoire de Genève, Raoul Behrend
 Discovery Circumstances: Numbered Minor Planets (1)-(5000) – Minor Planet Center
 
 

003330
Discoveries by Thomas Schildknecht
Named minor planets
19850912